The Canary Islands Championship was a professional golf tournament that was held 6–9 May 2021 at Golf Costa Adeje in Tenerife, Spain.

The tournament was intended to be a one-off event and was played the week after the Tenerife Open, creating a three-week swing of events in the Canary Islands.

Garrick Higgo won the event for his second win in the Canary Islands in the space of three weeks.

Winners

References

External links
Event page on the official site of the European Tour

Former European Tour events
Golf tournaments in Spain
Sport in Tenerife
2021 establishments in Spain